This is a list of lakes of Ontario beginning with the letter B.

B–Ba
B Lake
Bab Lake
Babcock Lake
Babey Lake
Babiche Lake
Babin Lake
Babs Lake
Baby Joe Lake
Baby Lake (Joseph Lake, Seguin)
Baby Lake (Sudbury District)
Baby Lake (Clear Lake, Seguin)
Baby Lake
Baby Shingwak Lake
Babycoot Lake
Bacchus Mud Lake
Bach Lake (Thunder Bay District)
Bach Lake (Timiskaming District)
Back Lake (Algoma District)
Back Lake (Thunder Bay District)
Back Lake (Parry Sound District)
Back Lake (Hastings County)
Backup Lake
Backward Lake
Bacon Lake (Parry Sound District)
Bacon Lake (Algoma District)
Bad Lake (Sudbury District)
Bad Lake (Nipissing District)
Bad Lake (Cochrane District)
Bad Medicine Lake
Bad Vermilion Lake
Baden-Powell Lake
Bader Lake
Badesdawa Lake
Badge Lake
Badgeley Lake
Badger Lake (Sudbury District)
Badger Lake (Thunder Bay District)
Badgerow Lake
Badgley Lake
Badland Lake
Badour Lake
Badrock Lake
Badshaw Lake
Badshot Lake
Badwater Lake (Thunder Bay District)
Badwater Lake (Rainy River District)
Baerr Lake
Baffle Lake
Bag Lake
Baggy Lake
Bagot Long Lake
Bagpipe Lake
Bagsverd Lake
Bailey Lake (Frechette Township, Sudbury District)
Bailey Lake (Ulster Township, Sudbury District)
Bailey Lake (Lennox and Addington County)
Bailey Lake (Renfrew County)
Bailey Lake (Bridgland Township, Algoma District)
Bailey Lake (Kenora District)
Bailey Lake (Muskoka District)
Bailey Lake (Nipissing District)
Bailey Lake (Opasatika Township, Algoma District)
Bailey Lake (Timiskaming District)
Baileys Lake
Baillargeon Lake
Baimwawa Lake
Bain Lake (Parry Sound District)
Bain Lake (Nipissing District)
Bain Lake (Sudbury District)
Bain Lake (Kenora District)
Baird Lake (Algoma District)
Baird Lake (Rainy River District)
Baisley Lake
Bait Lake
Baize Lake
Bajoras Lake
Bakado Lake
Bake Lake
Baker Lake (Howells Township, Cochrane District)
Baker Lake (Timmins)
Baker Lake (Kenora District)
Baker Lake (Timiskaming District)
Baker Lake (Haliburton County)
Baker Lake (Tweed Township, Cochrane District)
Baker Lake (Thunder Bay District)
Baker Lake (Sudbury District)
Balancing Lake
Bald Lake
Baldcoot Lake
Baldhead Lake (Algoma District)
Baldhead Lake (Thunder Bay District)
Baldwin Lake (Nipissing District)
Baldwin Lake (Thunder Bay District)
Baldwin Lake (Rainy River District)
Baldwins Lake
Baldy Lake
Bale Lake
Bales Lake
Balfour Lake (Cochrane District)
Balfour Lake (Nipissing District)
Balfour Lake (Sudbury District)
Balkam Lake
Ball Lake (Kenora District)
Ball Lake (Parry Sound District)
Ball Lake (Thunder Bay District)
Ball Lake (Lennox and Addington County)
Ballantyne Lake (Wikweyau Creek, Cochrane District)
Ballantyne Lake (Mowbray Township, Cochrane District)
Ballantyne Lake (Nipissing District)
Ballard Lake (Algoma District)
Ballard Lake (Rainy River District)
Ballast Lake
Ballina Lake
Ballinafad Lake
Ballon Lake
Balmain Lake
Balmer Lake (Kenora District)
Balmer Lake (Renfrew County)
Balmoral Lake
Balne Lake
Balog Lake
Baloney Lake (Algoma District)
Baloney Lake (Thunder Bay District)
Balsam Lake (Nipissing District)
Balsam Lake (Kawartha Lakes)
Balsam Lake (Killarney)
Balsam Lake (Cochrane District)
Balsam Lake (Frechette Township, Sudbury District)
Balsam Lake (Thunder Bay District)
Balsam Lake (Parry Sound District)
Balsawood Lake
Balson Lake
Baltic Lake
Baltimore Lake
Baltzer Lake
Bamaji Lake
Bambino Lake
Bamboo Lake
Bamford Lake (Cochrane District)
Bamford Lake (Kenora District)
Bamoos Lake
Banak Lake
Banana Lake (Dalmas Township, Sudbury District)
Banana Lake (Topham Township, Sudbury District)
Banana Lake (Nickle Township, Thunder Bay District)
Banana Lake (Kenora District)
Banana Lake (Valin Township, Sudbury District)
Banana Lake (Timiskaming District)
Banana Lake (Temagami)
Banana Lake (Hornepayne)
Banana Lake (Rainy River District)
Banana Lake (Garrow Township, Nipissing District)
Banana Lake (Winston Creek, Thunder Bay District)
Banana Lake (Elliot Lake)
Bananish Lake
Bancar Lake
Bancroft Lake
Band Lake (Nipissing District)
Band Lake (Sudbury District)
Bandit Lake
Bangs Lake
Bank Lake
Banker Lake
Bankfield Lake
Banks Lake (Timiskaming District)
Banks Lake (Cochrane District)
Bannagan Lake
Banner Lake (Timiskaming District)
Banner Lake (Hastings County)
Bannerman Lake (Cochrane District)
Bannerman Lake (Sudbury District)
Banning Lake
Bannister Lake (Waterloo Region)
Bannister Lake (Thunder Bay District)
Bannockburn Lake
Banquet Lake
Banshee Lake (Canisbay Township, Nipissing District)
Banshee Lake (West Nipissing)
Banville Lake
Baptism Lake
Baptiste Lake (Timiskaming District)
Baptiste Lake (Hastings County)
Bar Lake (Sudbury District)
Bar Lake (Kenora District)
Baragar Lake
Barager's Lake
Barbara Lake (Namewaminikan River, Thunder Bay District)
Barbara Lake (Barbara Creek, Thunder Bay District)
Barbara Lake (Algoma District)
Barbaro Lake
Barbe Lake
Barber Lake (Cochrane District)
Barber Lake (Speight Township, Timiskaming District)
Barber Lake (McGarry)
Barber Lake (Rainy River District)
Barbers Lake
Barbut Lake
Barclay Lake
Bard Lake
Bardney Lake
Bardwell Lake
Bare Hill Lake
Bare Lake
Bare Tent Lake
Barefoot Lakes
Barehead Lake
Barfoot Lake
Barge Lake
Baril Lake
Barite Lake
Bark Lake (Keikewabik Lake, Kenora District)
Bark Lake (Haliburton County)
Bark Lake (Lumby Creek, Kenora District)
Bark Lake (Assad Township, Algoma District)
Bark Lake (Renfrew County)
Bark Lake (Sudbury District)
Bark Lake (Barnes Township, Algoma District)
Barker Lake
Barkley Lake
Barkway Lake
Barland Lake
Barlow Lake (MacBeth Township, Sudbury District)
Barlow Lake (Hendrie Township, Sudbury District)
Barmac Lake
Barn Lake (Bikerace Lake, Thunder Bay District)
Barn Lake (Algoma District)
Barn Lake (Oboshkegan Township, Thunder Bay District)
Barnabe Lake
Barnacle Lake
Barnard Lake (Lennox and Addington County)
Barnard Lake (Thunder Bay District)
Barnard Lake (Timiskaming District)
Barnes Lake (Muskoka District)
Barnes Lake (Nipissing District)
Barnes Lake (Kenora District)
Barnes Lake (Cochrane District)
Barnet Lake (Cochrane District)
Barnet Lake (Sudbury District)
Barnett Lake
Barney Lake (Algoma District)
Barney Lake (Parry Sound District)
Barney Lake (Bruce County)
Barnhart Lake
Barns Lake
Barnspoon Lake
Barnston Lake
Barnum Lake (Jacques Township, Thunder Bay District)
Barnum Lake (Haliburton County)
Barnum Lake (McGillis Township, Thunder Bay District)
Barr Lake (Kenora District)
Barr Lake (Timiskaming District)
Barr Lake (Algoma District)
Barr Lake (Renfrew County)
Barr Lake (Thunder Bay District)
Barrage Lake
Barras Lake
Barre Lake
Barred Owl Lake
Barrel Lake
Barrett Lake
Barrett Pond
Barrette Lake
Barretts Lake
Barretts Pond
Barrhead Mill Pond
Barrie Lake
Barrie's Lake
Barrigar Lake
Barrington Lake
Barris Lake
Barron Lake
Barron's Lake
Barrs Lake (Renfrew County)
Barrs Lake (Frontenac County)
Barry Lake (Northumberland County)
Barry Lake (Renfrew County)
Barse Lake
Bart Lake
Barter Lake
Barth Lake (Kenora District)
Barth Lake (Timiskaming District)
Bartle Lake
Bartlett Lake (Timiskaming District)
Bartlett Lake (Nipissing District)
Bartlett Lake (Hastings County)
Bartley Lake (Bruce County)
Bartley Lake (Kenora District)
Bartman Lake
Barton Lake (Frontenac County)
Barton Lake (Parry Sound District)
Bartraw Lake
Barty Lake
Base Lake (Jackman Township, Kenora District)
Base Lake (Algoma District)
Base Lake (Base Creek, Kenora District)
Baseline Lake
Basen Lake
Basher Lake
Basil Lake (Kenora District)
Basil Lake (Nipissing District)
Basils Lake
Basin Lake (Kenora District)
Basin Lake (Nipissing District)
Basin Lake (Leeds and Grenville United Counties)
Basket Lake (Basket River, Kenora District)
Basket Lake (Redditt Township, Kenora District)
Bass Lake (Kashabowie Lake, Thunder Bay District)
Bass Lake (Valley East, Greater Sudbury)
Bass Lake (Timiskaming District)
Bass Lake (Grey County)
Bass Lake (Manitoulin District)
Bass Lake (Patterson Township, Parry Sound District)
Bass Lake (Killarney)
Bass Lake (Renfrew County)
Bass Lake (Simcoe County)
Bass Lake (Shuniah)
Bass Lake (Haentschel Township, Sudbury District)
Bass Lake (South Frontenac)
Bass Lake (Central Frontenac)
Bass Lake (Rainy River District)
Bass Lake (Telfer Township, Sudbury District)
Bass Lake (Aberdeen Township, Algoma District)
Bass Lake (Blind River)
Bass Lake (Wilson Township, Parry Sound District)
Bass Lake (Whitefish Lake 6)
Bass Lake (Baril Lake, Thunder Bay District)
Bass Lake (Syine Township, Thunder Bay District)
Bass Lake (Walden, Greater Sudbury)
Bass Lake (Peterborough County)
Bass Lake (Eagle Lake, Kenora District)
Bass Lake (Leeds and the Thousand Islands)
Bass Lake (Mongowin Township, Sudbury District)
Bass Lake (Rideau Lakes)
Bass Lake (Parkin Township, Greater Sudbury)
Bass Lake (Roughrock Lake, Kenora District)
Bass Lake (Muskoka Lakes)
Bass Lake (Morse Township, Sudbury District)
Bass Lake (Cameron Lake, Kenora District)
Bass Lake (Gravenhurst)
Bass Pond
Bassfin Lake
Basshaunt Lake
Basshook Lake
Bassoon Lake
Basswood Lake (Algoma District)
Basswood Lake (Rainy River District)
Bassy Lake
Bastedo Lake
Bastian Lake
Bat Lake (Nipissing District)
Bat Lake (Parry Sound District)
Bat Lake (Minden Hills)
Bat Lake (Sudbury District)
Bat Lake (Dysart et al)
Bat Lake (Dorion)
Bat Lake (Barnacle Lake, Thunder Bay District)
Bat Lake (Rainy River District)
Batchawana Lake
Batchelor Lake
Batchewaung Lake
Bate Lake (Thunder Bay District)
Bate Lake (Kenora District)
Batelle Lake
Bateman Lake
Bates Lake
Bath Lake (Pays Plat River, Thunder Bay District)
Bath Lake (Boiling Sand River, Thunder Bay District)
Bathurst Lake
Batise Lake (Nipissing District)
Batise Lake (Thunder Bay District)
Batters Lake
Battersby Lake
Battery Lake
Battley Lake
Batwing Lake
Baubee Lake
Baudette Lake
Baumheur Lake
Bawden Lake
Bawk Lake
Baxter Lake (Cochrane District)
Baxter Lake (Lanark County)
Baxter Lake (Muskoka District)
Bay Berry Lakes
Bay Lake (Tweedle Township, Algoma District)
Bay Lake (Cochrane District)
Bay Lake (Patton Township, Algoma District)
Bay Lake (Blind River)
Bay Lake (Hastings County)
Bay Lake (Parry Sound District)
Bay Lake (Timiskaming District)
Bay Lake (Nipissing District)
Bay Lake (Lessard Township, Algoma District)
Bay Lake (Sudbury District)
Bayfield Lake
Bayly Lake (Sudbury District)
Bayly Lake (Kenora District)
Bayly Lake (Cochrane District)
Baynes Lake
Bays Lake
Bayshell Lake
Bayson Lake
Bayswater Lake
Baytree Lake
Bayview Lake

Be
Bea Lake (Cochrane District)
Bea Lake (Hastings County)
Beach Lake (Nipissing District)
Beach Lake (Kenora District)
Beacon Lake
Beadle Lake
Beagle Lake
Beak Lake (Kenora District)
Beak Lake (Algoma District)
Beales Lake
Beamish Lake
Bean Lake (Bean Creek, Kenora District)
Bean Lake (MacNicol Township, Kenora District)
Bean Lake (Thunder Bay District)
Bean Lake (Straight Lake, Kenora District)
Bean Lake (Algoma District)
Bean Lake (Cochrane District)
Beanpod Lake
Beanpole Lake
Bear Den Lake
Bear Head Lake
Bear Lake (Roosevelt Township, Sudbury District)
Bear Lake (French River)
Bear Lake (Hornepayne)
Bear Lake (Manitoulin District)
Bear Lake (East Burpee Township, Whitestone)
Bear Lake (Georgian Bay)
Bear Lake (North Frontenac)
Bear Lake (Thunder Bay District)
Bear Lake (Renfrew County)
Bear Lake (Hunter Township, Nipissing District)
Bear Lake (Pistol Creek, Kenora District)
Bear Lake (West Nipissing)
Bear Lake (Hastings County)
Bear Lake (McMurrich/Monteith)
Bear Lake (Lennox and Addington County)
Bear Lake (Haliburton County)
Bear Lake (Bedford Township, South Frontenac)
Bear Lake (South Algonquin)
Bear Lake (Hammell Township, Nipissing District)
Bear Lake (Lehman Township, Algoma District)
Bear Lake (Muskoka Lakes)
Bear Lake (Burton Township, Whitestone)
Bear Lake (Pettypiece Township, Kenora District)
Bear Lake (Timiskaming District)
Bear Lake (Loughborough Township, South Frontenac)
Bear Lake (Yeo Township, Sudbury District)
Bear Lake (Hollinger Township, Sudbury District)
Bear Lake (Cochrane District)
Bear Lake (Rice Lake, Kenora District)
Bear Mountain Lake
Bear Pond (Kenora District)
Bear Pond (Lennox and Addington County)
Bear Shanty Lake
Bear Tooth Lake
Bear Trap Lake
Bearbone Lake
Bearcub Lake
Beardens Lake
Beardmore Lake
Bearhead Lake
Bearpad Lake
Bearpaw Lake (Kenora District)
Bearpaw Lake (Muskoka District)
Bearpaw Lake (Algoma District)
Bearpelt Lake
Bearshead Lake
Bearskin Lake (Kenora District)
Bearskin Lake (Thunder Bay District)
Bearskull Lake
Bearsmouth Lake
Beartrack Lake (Sudbury District)
Beartrack Lake (Kenora District)
Beartrap Lake (Banner Creek, Thunder Bay District)
Beartrap Lake (Blackwater River, Thunder Bay District)
Beasley Lake
Beast Lake
Beath Lake
Beaton Lake (Muskoka District)
Beaton Lake (Algoma District)
Beatrice Lake
Beatrix Lake
Beattie Lake (Sudbury District)
Beattie Lake (Cochrane District)
Beattie Lake (Bruce County)
Beattie Lake (Muskoka District)
Beattie Pond
Beatty Lake (Lennox and Addington County)
Beatty Lake (Lynch Creek, Thunder Bay District)
Beatty Lake (Greenstone)
Beatty's Lake
Beau Lake (Sudbury District)
Beau Lake (Nipissing District)
Beaubien Lake
Beaucage Lake (Cochrane District)
Beaucage Lake (Sudbury District)
Beaucoup Lakes
Beaudin Lake
Beaudry Lake (Sudbury District)
Beaudry Lake (Parry Sound District)
Beaudry Lake (Nipissing District)
Beauport Lake
Beauregard Lake
Beautiful Lake
Beauty Lake (Kenora District)
Beauty Lake (Timiskaming District)
Beaver Dam Lake
Beaver House Lake
Beaver Lake (Copenace Township, Algoma District)
Beaver Lake (Nipissing)
Beaver Lake (Lanark County)
Beaver Lake (Griffith Township, Greater Madawaska)
Beaver Lake (Greater Sudbury)
Beaver Lake (Pukaskwa River, Thunder Bay District)
Beaver Lake (Valin Township, Sudbury District)
Beaver Lake (Kearney)
Beaver Lake (Simcoe County)
Beaver Lake (Carling)
Beaver Lake (Chain Creek, Thunder Bay District)
Beaver Lake (Gunterman Township, Elliot Lake)
Beaver Lake (Bear Lake, Kenora District)
Beaver Lake (Begin Township, Thunder Bay District)
Beaver Lake (Lipton Township, Algoma District)
Beaver Lake (Keesickquayash Township, Algoma District)
Beaver Lake (Beange Township, Elliot Lake)
Beaver Lake (Roosevelt Township, Sudbury District)
Beaver Lake (Lennox and Addington County)
Beaver Lake (Zealand Township, Kenora District)
Beaver Lake (Timmins)
Beaver Lake (Magnetawan)
Beaver Lake (Gooseneck Lake, Kenora District)
Beaver Lake (Head, Clara and Maria)
Beaver Lake (Haliburton County)
Beaver Lake (Kennedy Township, Cochrane District)
Beaver Lake (Rainy River District)
Beaver Lake (Oso Township, Central Frontenac)
Beaver Lake (McGarry)
Beaver Lake (Haycock Township, Kenora District)
Beaver Lake (Matachewan 72)
Beaver Lake (Matawatchan Township, Greater Madawaska)
Beaver Lake (Peterborough County)
Beaver Lake (Olden Township, Central Frontenac)
Beaver Lake (Bayly Township, Timiskaming District)
Beaver Lake (Mackenzie River, Thunder Bay District)
Beaver Lake (Lessard Township, Algoma District)
Beaver Lakes (Greater Sudbury)
Beaver Lakes (Cochrane District)
Beaver Lakes (Sudbury District)
Beaver Meadow Lakes
Beaver Pond (Lennox and Addington County)
Beaver Pond (Thunder Bay District)
Beaver Pond (Renfrew County)
Beavercross Lake
Beaverdam Lake (Thunder Bay District)
Beaverdam Lake (Renfrew County)
Beaverflood Lake (Algoma District)
Beaverflood Lake (Sudbury District)
Beaverhide Lake
Beaverhouse Lake (Timiskaming District)
Beaverhouse Lake (Kenora District)
Beaverhouse Lake (Thunder Bay District)
Beaverhouse Lake (Algoma District)
Beaverhouse Lake (Rainy River District)
Beaverkit Lake (Thunder Bay District)
Beaverkit Lake (Algoma District)
Beaverlea Lake
Beaverlodge Lake
Beaverly Lake
Beavermud Lake
Beaverpaw Lake
Beaverpond Lake
Beaverskin Lake
Beaverstone Lake
Beavertail Lake (Cochrane District)
Beavertail Lake (Algoma District)
Beavertail Lake (Sudbury District)
Beavertooth Lake (Sudbury District)
Beavertooth Lake (Nipissing District)
Beavertrap Lake (Algoma District)
Beavertrap Lake (Thunder Bay District)
Beavis Lake
Bebees Lake
Beck Lake
Becker Lake
Beckett Lake (Sudbury District)
Beckett Lake (Parry Sound District)
Beckham Lake
Becking Lake
Beckington Lake
Becor Lake
Bedard Ponds
Bedford Lake
Bedivere Lake
Bednargik Lake
Bedore Lake
Bee Lake (Rainy River District)
Bee Lake (Nipissing District)
Bee Lake (Lac Seul, Kenora District)
Bee Lake (Tustin Township, Kenora District)
Bee Lake (Thunder Bay District)
Bee Lake (Cochrane District)
Bee Lake (Manigotagan River, Kenora District)
Bee Pond
Beebee Lake (Kenora District)
Beebee Lake (Lennox and Addington County)
Beech Lake (Kawartha Lakes)
Beech Lake (Haliburton County)
Beech Lake (Lennox and Addington County)
Beech-drops Pond
Beecher Lake
Beeches Lake
Beechnut Lake
Beef Lake
Beeftea Lake
Beeline Lake
Beeney Lake
Beer Lake (Kenora District)
Beer Lake (Haliburton County)
Beerman Lake
Beers Lake
Beeswax Lake
Beetle Lake
Beeva Lake
Beg Lake
Beggs Lake (Thunder Bay District)
Beggs Lake (Kenora District)
Begley Lake
Begonia Lake
Behan Lake
Beilby Lake
Beilhartz Lake
Beishlag Lake
Bejeau Lake
Beker Lake
Belair Lake
Belaire Lake
Beland Lake
Belanger Lake (Lascelles Township, Algoma District)
Belanger Lake (Renfrew County)
Belanger Lake (Nipissing District)
Belanger Lake (Asselin Township, Algoma District)
Belanger Lakes
Belcoure Lake
Belec Lakes
Belfry Lake
Belgium Lake
Belisle Lake
Bell Lake (Kearney)
Bell Lake (Rainy River District)
Bell Lake (Thunder Bay District)
Bell Lake (Nipissing District)
Bell Lake (Machin)
Bell Lake (Greater Sudbury)
Bell Lake (Ferguson Township, McDougall)
Bell Lake (Algoma District)
Bell Lake (Timmins)
Bell Lake (Whitestone)
Bell Lake (GTP Block 7 Township)
Bell Lake (McDougall Township, McDougall)
Bell Lake (Mulvey Township, Cochrane District)
Bell Lake (Carter Township, Sudbury District)
Bell Lake (Badgley Lake, Kenora District)
Bell Rapids Lake
Bell's Lake
Bell's Pond
Bella Lake
Bellamys Lake
Belle Isle Lake
Belle Lake (Timiskaming District)
Belle Lake (Nipissing District)
Belle Lake (Kenora District)
Belleau Lake (Tupper Township, Algoma District)
Belleau Lake (Garden River 14)
Belleek Lake
Bellmore Lake
Bells Lake (Thunder Bay District)
Bells Lake (Parry Sound District)
Bells Lake (Grey County)
Bellsmith Lake
Belmont Lake
Beloporine Lake
Below Bow Lake
Belt Lake
Belton Lake
Bemar Lake
Ben Lake (Kenora District)
Ben Lake (Muskoka District)
Ben's Pond
Bena Lake
Benbow Lake
Bend Lake (Rainy River District)
Bend Lake (Sudbury District)
Bendall Lake
Bender Lake
Bending Knee Lake
Bending Lake
Benedict Lake
Benelux Lake
Beniah Lake
Benjamin Lake
Benmeen Lake
Benner Lake (Algoma District)
Benner Lake (Sudbury District)
Bennet Lake (Cochrane District)
Bennet Lake (Sudbury District)
Bennett Lake (Sudbury District)
Bennett Lake (Kenora District)
Bennett Lake (Lanark County)
Bennett Lake (Rainy River District)
Bennett Lake (Parry Sound District)
Bennett Lake (Hastings County)
Bennetts Lake
Benneweis Lake
Benninger Lake
Benny Lake
Benny's Lake
Benoir Lake
Benoit Lake
Benson Lake (Leeds and Grenville United Counties)
Benson Lake (Sudbury District)
Benson Lake (Muskoka District)
Benson Lake (Thunder Bay District)
Benson Lake (Timiskaming District)
Benson Lake (Kenora District)
Benstead Lake
Benstewart Lake
Bent Lake (Kenora District)
Bent Lake (Sudbury District)
Bentarm Lake (Kenora District)
Bentarm Lake (Thunder Bay District)
Bentarm Lake (Haliburton County)
Bentley Lake (Hastings County)
Bentley Lake (Thunder Bay District)
Bentley Lake (Cochrane District)
Bentpine Lake
Bentshoe Lakes
Bentti Lake
Beo Lake
Berberis Lake
Bercole Lake
Beresford Lake (Sudbury District)
Beresford Lake (Kenora District)
Berford Lake
Berg Lake
Berger Lake
Bergeron Lake
Berglund Lake
Bergman Lakes
Bergsma Lake
Berkstrom Lake
Berm Lake
Bernadine Lake (Kenora District)
Bernadine Lake (Thunder Bay District)
Bernard Lake (Sudbury District)
Bernard Lake (Renfrew County)
Bernard Lake (Algoma District)
Berndt Lake
Bernhardt Lake
Bernice Lake (Nipissing District)
Bernice Lake (Sudbury District)
Bernice Lake (Thunder Bay District)
Berniece Lake
Berry Lake (Muskoka District)
Berry Lake (Algoma District)
Berry Lake (Cochrane District)
Berry Lake (Nango River, Kenora District)
Berry Lake (Thunder Bay District)
Berry Lake (Sioux Narrows-Nestor Falls)
Berry Lakes
Berryblue Lake
Berrycan Lake
Berryman Lake
Bert Lake
Bertaud Lake
Bertha Lake (Thunder Bay District)
Bertha Lake (Kenora District)
Bertha Lake (Nipissing District)
Berthier Lake
Bertie Lake
Bertoia Lake
Bertrand Lake (Kenora District)
Bertrand Lake (Sudbury District)
Bertrand Lake (Algoma District)
Berube Lake (Kenora District)
Berube Lake (Timiskaming District)
Berwick Lake
Beshta Lake

Besley Lake
Bess Lake
Bessie Lake (Sudbury District)
Bessie Lake (Timiskaming District)
Bessie Lake (Thunder Bay District)
Best Lake
Best's Pond
Bester Lake
Beta Lake (Thunder Bay District)
Beta Lake (Sudbury District)
Beta Lake (Algoma District)
Beteau Lake
Beth Lake (Cochrane District)
Beth Lake (Nipissing District)
Beth Lake (Thunder Bay District)
Bethel Lake
Bethune Lake (Darrow Lake, Rainy River District)
Bethune Lake (Hardtack Creek, Rainy River District)
Betsy Lake
Betty Lake (Thunder Bay District)
Betty Lake (Nipissing District)
Betty Lake (Algoma District)
Betty Lake (Killarney)
Betty Lake (Tooms Township, Sudbury District)
Betula Lake
Between Lake
Beulah Lake (Thunder Bay District)
Beulah Lake (Sudbury District)
Bevan Lake (Cochrane District)
Bevan Lake (Parry Sound District)
Bevans Lake
Bevens Lake
Beverly Lake
Bevin Lake (Druillettes Township, Sudbury District)
Bevin Lake (Thunder Bay District)
Bevin Lake (Bevin Township, Sudbury District)
Bewag Lake
Bews Lake
Beynon Lake
Beyond Lake

Bi
Bianco Lake
Biber Lake
Biceps Lake
Bickford Lake
Bicknell Lake
Biddison Lake
Biddys Lake
Bidgood Pothole
Bidwell Lake
Bieber Lake
Biederman Pond
Bienda Lake
Bierce Lake
Biernacki Lake
Biff Lake
Big Bald Lake
Big Bass Lake
Big Bear Lake (Thunder Bay District)
Big Bear Lake (Algoma District)
Big Beaver Lake
Big Ben Lake
Big Bend Lake
Big Bilsky Lake
Big Birch Lake
Big Bissett Lake
Big Bob Lake
Big Boot Lake
Big Brother Lake
Big Buck Lake
Big Burnt Lake
Big Canoe Lake
Big Canon Lake
Big Caribou Lake
Big Cedar Lake
Big Clear Lake (South Frontenac)
Big Clear Lake (Central Frontenac)
Big Club Lake
Big Cranberry Lake
Big Crow Lake
Big Dawson Lake
Big Deer Lake
Big Duck Lake (Kawartha Lakes)
Big Duck Lake (Thunder Bay District)
Big Duck Pond
Big East Lake
Big Eneas Lake
Big Finlander Lake
Big Fish Lake
Big Fox Lake
Big George Lake
Big Ghee Lake
Big Gibson Lake
Big Goose Lake
Big Gull Lake (Sudbury District)
Big Gull Lake (Frontenac County)
Big Hardings Lake
Big Hawk Lake
Big Herring Lake
Big Hoover Lake
Big Horseshoe Lake
Big Hungry Lake
Big Island Lake (Big Island, Kenora District)
Big Island Lake (Shrub Creek, Kenora District)
Big Jawbone Lake
Big Jet Lake
Big Joe Lake (Rainy River District)
Big Joe Lake (Thunder Bay District)
Big John Lake
Big Lake (Frontenac County)
Big Lake (Corbiere Township, Algoma District)
Big Lake (Manitoulin District)
Big Lake (Kenora District)
Big Lake (Thunder Bay District)
Big Lake (Renfrew County)
Big Lake (Blind River)
Big Lighthouse Lake
Big Limestone Lake
Big Lynx Lake
Big Marconi Lake
Big Marl Lake
Big Marsh Lake (Sudbury District)
Big Marsh Lake (Algoma District)
Big McCaw Lake
Big McDougal Lake
Big McGarry Lake
Big McLouds Lake
Big McNeil Lake
Big Mink Lake
Big Moon Lake
Big Moose Lake (Kenora District)
Big Moose Lake (Timiskaming District)
Big Mountain Lake
Big Mud Lake (Bruce County)
Big Mud Lake (Kenora District)
Big Mud Lake (Lanark County)
Big North Lake
Big Ohlmann Lake
Big Orillia Lake
Big Otter Lake
Big Paddy Lake
Big Pearl Lake
Big Pike Lake (Algoma District)
Big Pike Lake (Cochrane District)
Big Pine Lake (Hendrie Township, Sudbury District)
Big Pine Lake (Gilliland Township, Sudbury District)
Big Point Pond
Big Poplar Lake
Big Porcupine Lake
Big Rae Lake
Big Rat Lake
Big Red Lake
Big Rice Lake
Big Rideau Lake
Big Rock Lake
Big Salmon Lake
Big Sand Lake
Big Sandy Lake
Big Sawbill Lake
Big Shingle Lake
Big Skunk Lake
Big Spring Lake
Big Stephen Lake
Big Sunfish Lake
Big Swamp Lake
Big Swan Lake
Big Swawell Lake
Big Thunder Lake
Big Trout Lake (Thunder Bay District)
Big Trout Lake (Nipissing District)
Big Trout Lake (Kenora District)
Big Trout Lake (Slievert Township, Algoma District)
Big Trout Lake (Sudbury District)
Big Trout Lake (Renfrew County)
Big Trout Lake (Kawartha Lakes)
Big Trout Lake (Cadeau Township, Algoma District)
Big Twin Lake
Big Valley Lake
Big Vermilion Lake
Big Webb Lake
Big Yirkie Lake
Bigamy Lake
Bigfault Lake
Bigfish Lake
Bigfools Lake
Bigford Lake
Bigfour Lake
Biggar Lake (Renfrew County)
Biggar Lake (Nipissing District)
Bigger Lake (Thunder Bay District)
Bigger Lake (Rainy River District)
Biggs Lake (Renfrew County)
Biggs Lake (Sudbury District)
Bigham Lake
Bigmarsh Lake
Bigrock Lake
Bigshell Lake
Bigwalk Lake
Bigwater Lake
Bigwind Lake
Bigwood Lake
Bijou Lake (Nipissing District)
Bijou Lake (Algoma District)
Bikerace Lake
Bilbe Lake
Bilge Lake
Bilkey Lake
Bill Lake (Selkirk Township, Sudbury District)
Bill Lake (Rainy River District)
Bill Lake (Thunder Bay District)
Bill Lake (Nipissing District)
Bill Lake (Kenora District)
Bill Lake (D'Arcy Township, Sudbury District)
Bill Lake (Kenora District)
Bill's Lake
Billboy Lake
Billet Lake
Billett Lake
Billie Lake
Billinger Lake
Billings Lake (Highlands East)
Billings Lake (Nipissing District)
Billings Lake (Dysart et al)
Billings Lake (Sudbury District)
Bills Pond
Billy Lake (Nipissing District)
Billy Lake (Sudbury District)
Billy Lake (Dorion)
Billy Lake (Killraine Township, Thunder Bay District)
Billy Lake (Thunder Bay District)
Billys Lake
Bilsky Lake
Bilton Lake
Binabick Lake
Binch Lake
Binder Lake
Bindo Lake
Binekan Lake
Bing Lake (Timiskaming District)
Bing Lake (Thunder Bay District)
Bing Lake (Sudbury District)
Bingle Lake
Bingley Lake
Bingo Lake
Binney Lake
Binns Lake
Binson Lake
Bipemaejoe Lake
Birch Lake (Sables-Spanish Rivers)
Birch Lake (Frontenac County)
Birch Lake (Cochrane District)
Birch Lake (Killraine Township, Thunder Bay District)
Birch Lake (Nipissing District)
Birch Lake (Michipicoten Island, Thunder Bay District)
Birch Lake (Macdonald, Meredith and Aberdeen Additional)
Birch Lake (Frechette Township, Sudbury District)
Birch Lake (Parry Sound District)
Birch Lake (French River)
Birch Lake (Huron Shores)
Birch Lake (Kane Township, Algoma District)
Birch Lake (Lurch River, Thunder Bay District)
Birch Lake (Timiskaming District)
Birch Lake (Slatterly Lake, Kenora District)
Birch Lake (Evans Township, Sudbury District)
Birch Lake (Rainy River District)
Birch Lake (Redditt Township, Kenora District)
Birch Lake (War Eagle Lake, Kenora District)
Birch Pond
Birchall Lake
Bircham Lake
Birchbark Lake (Manitoulin District)
Birchbark Lake (Peterborough County)
Birchcliffe Lake
Bird Lake (Nipissing District)
Bird Lake (Rainy River District)
Bird Lake (Muskoka District)
Bird Lake (Sudbury District)
Bird Lake (Parry Sound District)
Bird Lake (Timiskaming District)
Bird Lake (Hastings County)
Birdie Lake
Birmingham Lake
Birston Lake
Birthday Lake
Biscotasi Lake
Biscuit Lake
Bisect Lake
Bishop Lake (Nipissing District)
Bishop Lake (White Otter River, Thunder Bay District)
Bishop Lake (Cochrane District)
Bishop Lake (Frontenac County)
Bishop Lake (Bishop Creek, Thunder Bay District)
Bishops Lake
Bisk Lake
Bissett Lake
Bissonnette Lake
Bit Lake (Nipissing District)
Bit Lake (Rainy River District)
Bitch Lake
Bitchu Lake
Bite Lake (Biff Lake, Thunder Bay District)
Bite Lake (Bite Creek, Thunder Bay District)
Bithrey Lake
Biting Lake
Bitten Lake
Bitter Lake
Bittern Lake (Rainy River District)
Bittern Lake (Parry Sound District)
Bittern Lake (Cochrane District)
Bittern Lake (Thunder Bay District)
Bittern Lake (Algoma District)
Bittern Lake (Sudbury District)
Bivo Lake
Bivouac Lake (Haliburton County)
Bivouac Lake (Kenora District)
Biz Lake
Bizhiw Lake
Biznar Lake

Bl
Black Bass Lake
Black Bear Lake
Black Beaver Lake (Lessard Township, Algoma District)
Black Beaver Lake (Kenora District)
Black Beaver Lake (Greenwood Township, Algoma District)
Black Beaver Lake (Beaton Township, Algoma District)
Black Birch Lake
Black Donald Lake
Black Duck Lake
Black Feather Lake
Black Fox Lake (Thunder Bay District)
Black Fox Lake (Algoma District)
Black Lake (Minden Hills)
Black Lake (Lockeyer Township, Algoma District)
Black Lake (Parry Sound District)
Black Lake (Thunder Bay District)
Black Lake (Peterborough County)
Black Lake (Lanark County)
Black Lake (Lake of Bays)
Black Lake (Central Frontenac)
Black Lake (North Frontenac)
Black Lake (Sioux Narrows-Nestor Falls)
Black Lake (Brougham Township, Greater Madawaska)
Black Lake (Barager Township, Algoma District)
Black Lake (LeCaron Township, Algoma District)
Black Lake (Portland Township, South Frontenac)
Black Lake (Grey County)
Black Lake (Bedford Township, South Frontenac)
Black Lake (Bagot Township, Greater Madawaska)
Black Lake (Rainy River District)
Black Lake (Marchington River), Kenora District
Black Lake (Muskoka Lakes)
Black Lake (Cochrane District)
Black Lake (Spanish)
Black Lake (Dysart et al)
Black Lake (Stormont, Dundas and Glengarry United Counties)
Black Lake (Blind River)
Black Lakes
Black Mandyn Lake
Black Mountain Lake
Black Oak Lake
Black Sturgeon Lake
Black Sturgeon Lakes
Black Trout Lake
Black's Lake
Blackbass Lake (Lennox and Addington County)
Blackbass Lake (Nipissing District)
Blackbear Lake (Swan Lake, Kenora District)
Blackbear Lake (Trout Lake, Kenora District)
Blackberry Lake (Haliburton County)
Blackberry Lake (Parry Sound District)
Blackbill Lake
Blackbirch Lake
Blackbird Lake
Blackbluff Lake
Blackburn Lake (Cochrane District)
Blackburn Lake (Timiskaming District)

Blackcat Lake
Blackduck Lake
Blackett Lake
Blackfish Lake
Blackfox Lake (Nipissing District)
Blackfox Lake (Timiskaming District)
Blackfox Lake (Kenora District)
Blackie's Lake
Blackington Lake
Blackmoore Lake
Blackmud Lake
Blackout Lake
Blackpelt Lake

Blackspruce Lake
Blackstar Lake
Blackstone Lake (Kenora District)
Blackstone Lake (Rainy River District)
Blackstone Lake (Parry Sound District)
Blackthorn Lake
Blackwater Lake (Thunder Bay District)
Blackwater Lake (Whitefish Lake 6)
Blackwater Lake (Cochrane District)
Blackwater Lake (Stobie Township, Sudbury District)
Blackwater Lake (Warren Township, Sudbury District)
Blackwater Lake (Parry Sound District)
Blackwell Lake (Muskoka District)
Blackwell Lake (Timiskaming District)
Blades Lake
Blair Lake (Thunder Bay District)
Blair Lake (Sudbury District)
Blair Lake (Kenora District)
Blair Lake (Parry Sound District)
Blairs Lake
Blake Lake (Manitoulin District)
Blake Lake (Timiskaming District)
Blake Lake (Kenora District)
Blakelock Lake
Blakely Lake
Blakes Lake
Blanchard Lake
Blanchards Lake
Blanche Lake (Timiskaming District)
Blanche Lake (Algoma District)
Blanco Lake
Bland Lake
Blank Lake
Blanket Lake
Blasko Lake
Blay Lake
Blende Lake
Blimkie Lake
Blind Beaver Lake
Blind Lake (Frontenac County)
Blind Lake (Peterborough County)
Blind Lake (Algoma District)
Blind Lake (Renfrew County)
Blind Lake (Huron County)
Blindfold Lake
Blinko Lake
Bliss Lake (Rainy River District)
Bliss Lake (Thunder Bay District)
Bliss Lake (Sudbury District)
Blithfield Long Lake
Blob Lake
Bloch Lake
Block Lake
Block's Pond
Blockville Lake
Blonde Lake
Blondin Lake
Blood Lake
Bloody Lake
Bloom Lake
Bloomfield Mill Pond
Bloor Lake
Blossom Lake
Blotter Lake (Haliburton County)
Blotter Lake (Thunder Bay District)
Blount Lake
Blowdown Lake (Nipissing District)
Blowdown Lake (Algoma District)
Blowing Lake
Blowout Lake
Bloxham Lake
Bludgeon Lake
Blue Cedar Lake
Blue Chalk Lake
Blue Coat Lakes
Blue Goose Lake
Blue Hawk Lake
Blue Heaven Lake
Blue Lagoon
Blue Lake (Brant County)
Blue Lake (North Frontenac)
Blue Lake (Clute Township, Cochrane District)
Blue Lake (South Frontenac)
Blue Lake (Seguin)
Blue Lake (McCaul Township, Rainy River District)
Blue Lake (Algoma District)
Blue Lake (Kearney)
Blue Lake (East Burpee Township, Whitestone)
Blue Lake (Hagerman Township, Whitestone)
Blue Lake (Whitesand River, Thunder Bay District)
Blue Lake (Kenora District)
Blue Lake (Thompson Lake, Rainy River District)
Blue Lake (Greenstone)
Blue Lake (Sudbury District)
Blue Lake (Bishop Township, Nipissing District)
Blue Lake (Peterborough County)
Blue Lake (McAuslan Township, Nipissing District)
Blue Lake (Timmins)
Blue Pine Lake
Blue Sea Lakes
Blue Sky Lake
Blue Springs Pond
Blue-winged Teal Lake
Bluebeard Lake
Bluebell Lake (Nipissing District)
Bluebell Lake (Kenora District)
Bluebelle Lake
Blueberry Lake (Roughrock Lake, Kenora District)
Blueberry Lake (Hodgins Lake, Kenora District)
Blueberry Lake (Wild Lake, Kenora District)
Blueberry Lake (Nipissing District)
Blueberry Lake (Haliburton County)
Blueberry Lake (Algoma District)
Blueberry Lake (Lanark County)
Blueberry Lake (Frontenac County)
Blueberry Lake (Sudbury District)
Blueberry Lake (Timiskaming District)
Blueberry Lake (Cochrane District)
Bluebill Lake (Thunder Bay District)
Bluebill Lake (Nipissing District)
Bluebird Lake (Algoma District)
Bluebird Lake (Thunder Bay District)
Bluebird Lake (Nipissing District)
Bluebottle Lake
Blueboy Lake
Blueglass Lake
Bluegoose Lake
Bluejay Lake (Cochrane District)
Bluejay Lake (Thunder Bay District)
Bluejay Lake (Nipissing District)
Blues Lake
Bluesea Lake
Bluesky Lake
Bluesucker Lake
Bluett Lake
Bluewater Lake
Bluewater Lakes
Bluff Lake (Thunder Bay District)
Bluff Lake (Hastings County)
Bluff Lake (Stobie Township, Sudbury District)
Bluff Lake (Tilton Township, Sudbury District)
Bluff Lake (Algoma District)
Bluff Lake (Kenora District)
Bluff Pond
Bluffpoint Lake
Bluffy Lake (Kenora District)
Bluffy Lake (Thunder Bay District)
Blunder Lake
Blush Lake
Blyth Lake

Bo
Bo Lake
Boat Lake (Algoma District)
Boat Lake (Kenora District)
Boat Lake (Bruce County)
Boat Lake (Thunder Bay District)
Bob Chips Lake
Bob Lake (Nipissing District)
Bob Lake (Algoma District)
Bob Lake (Parry Sound District)
Bob Lake (Scotia Township, Sudbury District)
Bob Lake (Van Horne Township, Kenora District)
Bob Lake (MacMurchy Township, Sudbury District)
Bob Lake (Norm Lake, Kenora District)
Bob Lake (Haliburton County)
Bob's Lake (Cochrane District)
Bob's Lake (Hastings County)
Bob's Lake (Parry Sound District)
Bobalong Lake
Bobbie Lake
Bobcam Lake
Bobcat Lake
Bobo Lake
Bobowash Lake
Bobs Lake (Renfrew County)
Bobs Lake (North Frontenac)
Bobs Lake (Sudbury District)
Bobs Lake (Cochrane District)
Bobs Lake (South Frontenac)
Bobsled Lake
Bobtail Lake (Sudbury District)
Bobtail Lake (Timiskaming District)
Bobwhite Lake
Bock Lake (Algoma District)
Bock Lake (Rainy River District)
Bodell Lake
Bodina Lake
Bodkin Lake
Bodner Lake
Boehmes Pond
Boer Lake
Boffin Lake
Bog Lake (Corbiere Township, Algoma District)
Bog Lake (Kenora District)
Bog Lake (Peterborough County)
Bog Lake (Rainy River District)
Bog Lake (Johnson)
Bog Lake (Keating Additional Township, Algoma District)
Bog Pond
Bogart Lake
Bogert Lake
Boggy Lake (Nipissing District)
Boggy Lake (Thunder Bay District)
Boggy Pond
Bogie Lake
Bogle Lake
Bogus Lake
Boice Lake
Boil Lake
Boisey Lake
Boisvert Lake
Boivin Lake (Sudbury District)
Boivin Lake (Nipissing District)
Bojack Lake
Bolan Lake
Boland Lake (Algoma District)
Boland Lake (Nipissing District)
Boland Lake (Timiskaming District)
Boland's Lake
Bolands Lake
Bold Lake (Rainy River District)
Bold Lake (Thunder Bay District)
Bolduc Lake
Bolger Lake (Parry Sound District)
Bolger Lake (Peterborough County)
Bolger's Lake
Boling Lake
Bolio Lake
Bolkow Lake
Bolster Lake
Bolt Lake
Bolton Lake (Kenora District)
Bolton Lake (Timiskaming District)
Bolton Lake (Cochrane District)
Bolton Lakes
Bompas Lake
Bon Echo Lake
Bonamico Lake
Bonanza Lake (Sudbury District)
Bonanza Lake (Kenora District)
Bonar Lake
Bonasa Lake
Bond Lake (York Region)
Bond Lake (Rioux Township, Algoma District)
Bond Lake (Wawa)
Bond Lake (Timiskaming District)
Bondy Lake
Bone Lake (Timiskaming District)
Bone Lake (Rainy River District)
Bone Lake (Haliburton County)
Bone Lake (Brule Township, Algoma District)
Bone Lake (Bayfield Township, Algoma District)
Bone Lake (Tupper Township, Algoma District)
Bonesteel Lake
Bonfield Lake
Bonhomme Lake
Bonis Lake
Bonita Lake
Bonne Lake
Bonnechere Lake
Bonnell Lake
Bonner Lake (Cochrane District)
Bonner Lake (Thunder Bay District)
Bonnet Lake (Algoma District)
Bonnet Lake (Kenora District)
Bonnie Lake (Thunder Bay District)
Bonnie Lake (Muskoka District)
Bonsall Lake
Boobus Lake
Boodis Lake
Booger Lake
Book Lake (Algoma District)
Book Lake (Kenora District)
Boom Lake (Nipissing District)
Boom Lake (Algoma District)
Boom Lake (Cochrane District)
Boom Lake (Thunder Bay District)
Boomer Lake (Kenora District)
Boomer Lake (Ball Lake, Thunder Bay District)
Boomer Lake (Rabbitbelly Lake, Thunder Bay District)
Boomerang Lake (Timiskaming District)
Boomerang Lake (Thunder Bay District)
Boomerang Lake (Sudbury District)
Boomerang Lake (Winkler Township, Algoma District)
Boomerang Lake (Walls Township, Algoma District)
Boon Lake
Boot Lake (Gibson Township, Georgian Bay)
Boot Lake (Jackson Township, Algoma District)
Boot Lake (Preston Township, Nipissing District)
Boot Lake (Timiskaming District)
Boot Lake (Kawartha Lakes)
Boot Lake (Reilly Township, Algoma District)
Boot Lake (Butler Township, Nipissing District)
Boot Lake (Greater Sudbury)
Boot Lake (Redditt Township, Kenora District)
Boot Lake (Arden Township, Sudbury District)
Boot Lake (Press Lake, Kenora District)
Boot Lake (Tadpole Lake, Kenora District)
Boot Lake (Baxter Township, Georgian Bay)
Boot Lake (Rainy River District)
Boot Lake (Kagiano River, Thunder Bay District)
Boot Lake (Chaplin Township, Sudbury District)
Boot Lake (Eula Lake, Thunder Bay District)
Bootee Lake (Nipissing District)
Bootee Lake (Algoma District)
Booth Lake (Blyth Township, Nipissing District)
Booth Lake (Preston Township, Nipissing District)
Bootleg Lake (Rainy River District)
Bootleg Lake (Sudbury District)
Booty Lake
Bopeep Lake
Borden Lake (Timiskaming District)
Borden Lake (Sudbury District)
Border Lake
Borderline Lake
Borel Lake
Borgford Lake
Borland Lake
Bornite Lake
Borthwick Lake
Borutski Lake
Borzoi Lake
Boshkung Lake
Bosley Pond
Boss Lake (Parry Sound District)
Boss Lake (Garden River 14)
Boss Lake (Meath Township, Algoma District)
Bostebel Lake
Boston Lake
Bostwick Lake (Kenora District)
Bostwick Lake (Renfrew County)
Boswell Lake
Bosworth Lake
Botanist Lake
Botha Lake (Sudbury District)
Botha Lake (Timiskaming District)
Botham Lake
Bothnia Lake
Botink Lake
Botsford Lake
Bott's Lake
Bottle Bay Lake
Bottle Lake (Rabazo Township, Algoma District)
Bottle Lake (Rainy River District)
Bottle Lake (Lanark County)
Bottle Lake (White River)
Bottle Lake (Havelock-Belmont-Methuen)
Bottle Lake (Parry Sound District)
Bottle Lake (McMahon Township, Algoma District)
Bottle Lake (Trent Lakes)
Bottley Lake
Bottom Lake (Sudbury District)
Bottom Lake (Nipissing District)
Bouchard Lake (Timmins)
Bouchard Lake (O'Brien Township, Cochrane District)
Bouchard Lake (Ledger Township, Thunder Bay District)
Bouchard Lake (Sudbury District)
Bouchard Lake (Algoma District)
Bouchard Lake (Bryant Township, Thunder Bay District)
Boucher Lake (Sudbury District)
Boucher Lake (Kenora District)
Boucher Lake (Greater Sudbury)
Boucher Lake (Timiskaming District)
Boucher Lake (Nipissing District)
Bouck Pond
Bough Lake
Boughton Lake

Bougie Lake
Bouillon Lake (Biggar Township, Nipissing District)
Bouillon Lake (Calvin)
Boulay Lake
Boulder Lake (Kenora District)
Boulder Lake (Thunder Bay District)
Boulder Lake (Muskego Township, Sudbury District)
Boulder Lake (Hendrie Township, Sudbury District)
Boulder Lake (Algoma District)
Boulder Lake (Rainy River District)
Boulevard Lake
Boulter Lake (Hastings County)
Boulter Lake (Nipissing District)
Boulton Lake
Boumage Lake
Bound Lake
Boundary Lake (Rasin Creek, Kenora District)
Boundary Lake (Menard Township, Algoma District)
Boundary Lake (Haughton Township, Algoma District)
Boundary Lake (Muskoka District)
Boundary Lake (Blind River)
Boundary Lake (GTP Block 8 Township, Kenora District)
Boundary Lake (Duncan Township, Algoma District)
Boundary Lake (Point Lake, Kenora District)
Boundary Lake (Laidlaw Township, Cochrane District)
Boundary Lake (Spanish-Sable Rivers)
Boundary Lake (St-Louis Township, Sudbury District)
Boundary Lake (Timmins)
Boundary Lake (Parry Sound District)
Boundary Lake (Hastings County)
Boundary Lake (Elbow Lake, Thunder Bay District)
Boundary Lake (Rainy River District)
Boundary Lake (Huffman Township, Sudbury District)
Boundary Lake (Killarney)
Boundary Lake (Joynt Township, Thunder Bay District)
Boundary Lake (Renfrew County)

Boundary Lakes
Bourassa Lake
Bourdon Lake
Bourgeois Lake
Bourinot Lake
Bourke Lake
Bourzk Lake
Bouzan Lake
Bovin Lake
Bovril Lake
Bow Lake (Otoskwin River, Kenora District)
Bow Lake (Peterborough County)
Bow Lake (Sudbury District)
Bow Lake (Lanark County)
Bow Lake (Hastings County)
Bow Lake (Little Turtle River, Thunder Bay District)
Bow Lake (Haliburton County)
Bow Lake (Algoma District)
Bow Lake (Cochrane District)
Bowcott Lake
Bowden Lake
Bowen Lake
Bowen Pond
Bower Lake (Cochrane District)
Bower Lake (Nipissing District)
Bowern Lake
Bowers Lake
Bowes Lake
Bowl Lake (Sudbury District)
Bowl Lake (Thunder Bay District)
Bowland Lake
Bowler Lake
Bowley Lake
Bowman Lake (Kenora District)
Bowman Lake (Algoma District)
Bowsfield Lake
Bowstring Lake
Box Lake (Ogoki River, Thunder Bay District)
Box Lake (Syine Township, Thunder Bay District)
Box Lake (Rainy River District)
Box Lake (Sauerbrei Lake, Thunder Bay District)
Boxer Lake
Boy Lake
Boy Scout Lake
Boyce Lake (Nipissing District)
Boyce Lake (Rainy River District)
Boyce Lake (Kenora District)
Boyd Lake (Parry Sound District)
Boyd Lake (Cochrane District)
Boyd Lake (Grey County)
Boyd Lake (Sudbury District)
Boyd Lake (Timiskaming District)
Boyd Lake (Thunder Bay District)
Boyd Lake (Lanark County)
Boyd Lake (Nipissing District)
Boyden Lake
Boyea Lake
Boyer Lake (Timiskaming District)
Boyer Lake (Kenora District)
Boyer Lake (Thunder Bay District)
Boyer Lake (Algoma District)
Boyes Lake
Boyle Lake (Boyle Township, Cochrane District)
Boyle Lake (Algoma District)
Boyle Lake (Nassau Township, Cochrane District)
Boyne Lake
Boys Lake

Br
Brac Lake
Brace Lake (Timiskaming District)
Brace Lake (Thunder Bay District)
Bradburn Lake (Kenora District)
Bradburn Lake (Cochrane District)
Bradburn Lakes
Bradden Lake
Bradette Lake
Bradford Lakes
Bradfords Lake
Bradley Lake (Frontenac County)
Bradley Lake (Thunder Bay District)
Bradley Lake (Kenora District)
Bradley Lake (Hastings County)
Bradley Lake (Cochrane District)
Bradshaw Lake
Brady Lake (Haliburton County)
Brady Lake (Greater Sudbury)
Brady Lake (Frontenac County)
Brady Lake (Knight Township, Timiskaming District)
Brady Lake (Coleman)
Brady Lake (Sudbury District)
Bragg Lake (Cochrane District)
Bragg Lake (Sudbury District)
Braggan Lake
Bragh Lake
Braidwood Lake
Brain Lake
Brampton Lake
Branch Lake
Brandon Lake
Brandy Lake (Thunder Bay District)
Brandy Lake (Muskoka District)
Brandy Lake (Lanark County)
Branstrom Lake
Brant Lake (Palmer Township, Algoma District)
Brant Lake (Beauparlant Township, Algoma District)
Brant Lake (Nipissing District)
Brant Lake (Lalibert Township, Algoma District)
Brasees Lake
Brash Lake
Brass Lake
Brave Lake
Brawny Lake
Bray Lake (Timiskaming District)
Bray Lake (Parry Sound District)
Bray Lake (Cochrane District)
Bray Lake (Thunder Bay District)
Brayley Lake
Brazeau Lake
Brazil Lake
Bread Lake
Breadalbane Lake
Breadner Lake
Breakneck Lake
Breben Lake
Brebeuf Lake
Breck Lake (Usnac Township, Algoma District)
Breck Lake (Roy Township, Algoma District)
Breckenridge Lake
Breeches Lake
Breen Lake
Breeze Lake
Breezy Lake (Nipissing District)
Breezy Lake (Thunder Bay District)
Bregent Lake
Bremner Lake (Cochrane District)
Bremner Lake (Algoma District)
Bren Lake
Brennan Lake (Greater Madawaska)
Brennan Lake (Sudbury District)
Brennan Lake (Petawawa)
Brennan Lake (North Onaman River, Thunder Bay District)
Brennan Lake (Timiskaming District)
Brennan Lake (Allan Water, Thunder Bay District)
Brennan Lake (Parry Sound District)
Brent Lake
Brenton Lake
Bresnahan Lake (Kenora District)
Bresnahan Lake (Hastings County)
Bressette Lake
Brethour Lake
Brett Lake (Sudbury District)
Brett Lake (Timiskaming District)
Brett Lake (Thunder Bay District)
Brett Lake (Hastings County)
Bretz Lake
Brewer Lake (Nipissing District)
Brewer Lake (Rainy River District)
Brewer Lake (Frontenac County)
Brewer Park Pond
Brewery Lake
Brewster Lake
Brewster's Lake
Brian Lake (Kenora District)
Brian Lake (Algoma District)
Briarcliffe Lake
Bridge Lake (Parry Sound District)
Bridge Lake (Kenora District)
Bridge Lake (Algoma District)
Bridge Pond
Bridget Lake (Kenora District)
Bridget Lake (White River)
Bridget Lake (Rabazo Township, Algoma District)
Bridle Lake
Brief Lake
Brigam Lake
Briggs Lake (Kenora District)
Briggs Lake (Sudbury District)
Brigham Lake
Bright Lake (Thunder Bay District)
Bright Lake (Haliburton County)
Bright Lake (Algoma District)
Bright Lake (Parry Sound District)
Brightsand Lake
Brightwater Lake
Brigstocke Lake
Brik Lake
Brill Lake
Brilliant Lake
Brim Lake
Brimson Lake
Brink Lake
Brinka Lake
Brinklow Lake
Brinnie Lake
Brisbois Pond
Brislan Lake
Brisson Lake
Bristol Lake
Britain Lake
Britches Lake
Britchless Lake
British Lake
Britton Lake
Broad Lake
Broadbent Lake
Broadcast Lake
Broadley Lake
Broadside Lake
Broadsword Lake
Broadtail Lake
Broadwell Lake
Brock Lake (Sudbury District)
Brock Lake (Kenora District)
Brock Lake (Renfrew County)
Brock Lake (Parry Sound District)
Brock Lakes
Brocket Lake
Brockway Lake
Broddy Lake
Brodeur Lake
Brodill Lake
Broke Lake
Broken Paddle Lake
Broken Shoe Lake
Broker Lake
Bromley Lake
Bronson Lake (Sudbury District)
Bronson Lake (Nipissing District)
Bronson Lake (Hastings County)
Brook Lake (Algoma District)
Brook Lake (Lanark County)
Brook Lake (Thunder Bay District)
Brookdale Pond
Brooks Lake (Lennox and Addington County)
Brooks Lake (Hastings County)
Brooks Lake (Kenora District)
Brooks Lake (Muskoka District)
Brooks Lake (Algoma District)
Brooks Lake (Cochrane District)
Broom Lake (Thunder Bay District)
Broom Lake (Nipissing District)
Brophy Lake (Thunder Bay District)
Brophy Lake (Nipissing District)
Brophys Lake
Brothers Lake
Brotherson's Lake
Brotske Lake
Brough Lake
Brougham Lake
Broughton Lake
Bround Lake
Brouse Lake (Kenora District)
Brouse Lake (Thunder Bay District)
Brouse Pond
Brow Lake
Brown Bear Lake
Brown Lake (Durham Region)
Brown Lake (Colquhoun Township, Cochrane District)
Brown Lake (Kenora District)
Brown Lake (Thunder Bay District)
Brown Lake (Squirrel River, Cochrane District)
Brown Lake (Root Township, Algoma District)
Brown Lake (Rainy River District)
Brown Lake (Nipissing District)
Brown Lake (Sayer Township, Algoma District)
Brown Lake (Timmins)
Brown Trout Lake (Sioux Narrows-Nestor Falls)
Brown Trout Lake (Trout Lake, Kenora District)
Brown's Lake
Brownbear Lake
Browne Lake
Brownie Lake (Kenora District)
Brownie Lake (Nipissing District)
Browning Lake
Brownings Pond
Brownlee Lake
Brownley Lake
Browns Lake (Haliburton County)
Browns Lake (Renfrew County)
Browns Lake (Nipissing District)
Browns Lake (Kawartha Lakes)
Browns Lake (Lennox and Addington County)
Brownstone Lake
Browse Lake
Bruce Lake (Shingwaukonce Township, Algoma District)
Bruce Lake (Muskoka District)
Bruce Lake (Rambault Township, Algoma District)
Bruce Lake (Dowsley Township, Algoma District)
Bruce Lake (Nicol Township, Timiskaming District)
Bruce Lake (Kenny Township, Nipissing District)
Bruce Lake (Parry Sound District)
Bruce Lake (Kenora District)
Bruce Lake (Fripp Township, Algoma District)
Bruce Lake (Peck Township, Nipissing District)
Bruce Pond
Bruchardt Pond
Brucite Lake
Brue Lake
Bruin Lake
Brule Lake (Frontenac County)
Brule Lake (Haley Lake, Griffith Township, Greater Madawaska)
Brule Lake (Madawaska Valley)
Brule Lake (McDougalls Creek, Griffith Township, Greater Madawaska)
Brûlé Lake (Thunder Bay District)
Brûlé Lake (Hunter Township, Nipissing District)
Brûlé Lake (Stewart Township, Nipissing District)
Brumal Lake
Brundrit Lake
Brunelle Lake
Brunette Lake
Brunner Lake
Bruno Lake
Brunswick Lake
Brunton Lake
Brusaw Lake
Brush Lake (Parry Sound District)
Brush Lake (Kawartha Lakes)
Brush Lake (Reef Lake, Thunder Bay District)
Brush Lake (Brush Creek, Thunder Bay District)
Brush Lake (Timiskaming District)
Brush Lakes
Brute Lake
Brutus Lake (Moen Township, Sudbury District)
Brutus Lake (Brutus Township, Sudbury District)
Bryan Lake
Bryce Lake (Cochrane District)
Bryce Lake (Sudbury District)
Bryn Lake

Bu
Bubble Lake
Buch Lake
Buchan Lake
Buchanan Lake (Cochrane District)
Buchanan Lake (Haliburton County)
Buchanan Lake (Muskoka District)
Buchanan Lake (Flindt River, Thunder Bay District)
Buchanan Lake (Byron Township, Thunder Bay District)
Buchanan Lake (Oxford County)
Bucheski Lake
Bucholtz Lake
Buck Lake (North Frontenac)
Buck Lake (Georgian Bay)
Buck Lake (Sudbury District)
Buck Lake (Kawartha Lakes)
Buck Lake (Lunkie Township, Algoma District)
Buck Lake (Central Frontenac)
Buck Lake (Simcoe County)
Buck Lake (Lake of Bays)
Buck Lake (Killaloe, Hagarty and Richards)
Buck Lake (Tudor and Cashel)
Buck Lake (Gravenhurst)
Buck Lake (Hastings Highlands)
Buck Lake (McEwing Township, Algoma District)
Buck Lake (South Frontenac)
Buck Lake (Lennox and Addington County)
Buck Lake (Kenora District)
Buck Lake (McMurrich/Monteith)
Buck Lake (Cecile Township, Thunder Bay District)
Buck Lake (Brudenell, Lyndoch and Raglan)
Buck Lake (Kearney)
Buck Lake (Buck Creek, Thunder Bay District)
Buck Pond
Buck Shanty Lake
Buckaday Lake
Buckdeer Lake
Bucke Lake
Buckett Lake
Buckhorn Lake (Muskoka District)
Buckhorn Lake (Haliburton County)
Buckhorn Lake (Peterborough County)
Buckhorn Lake (Sudbury District)
Buckingham Lake
Buckingham Lakes
Buckley Lake
Buckram Lake
Bucksaw Lake
Buckshee Lake
Buckshot Lake (Algoma District)
Buckshot Lake (Sudbury District)
Buckshot Lake (Frontenac County)
Buckskin Lake (Highlands East)
Buckskin Lake (Algonquin Highlands)
Buckskin Lake (Renfrew County)
Buckskin Lakes
Buckwheat Lake
Bucky Pond
Bud Lake (Thunder Bay District)
Bud Lake (Nipissing District)
Bud Lake (Rainy River District)
Bud Lake (Algoma District)
Bud Lake (Sudbury District)
Buda Lake
Budall Lake
Budarick Lake
Budd Lake (Quill Township, Algoma District)
Budd Lake (McEwing Township, Algoma District)
Budd Lake (Sudbury District)
Buddell Lake
Buddy Lake
Budworm Lake
Buell Lake
Buells Creek Reservoir
Buff Lake
Buffalo Island Lake
Buffalo Lake
Buffington Lake
Bufflehead Lake
Buffy Lake
Bufo Lake
Bug Lake (Gooch Creek, Kenora District)
Bug Lake (Big Trout Lake, Kenora District)
Bug Lake (Sioux Narrows-Nestor Falls)
Bug Lake (Gullrock Lake, Kenora District)
Bug Lake (Bug Creek, Kenora District)
Bug Lake (Nipissing District)
Bugbee Lake
Buge Lake
Bugg Lake
Buhl Lake (Sudbury District)
Buhl Lake (Thunder Bay District)
Buie Lake
Bukadawin Lake
Bukemiga Lake
Buker Lake
Bukwaskeagog Lake
Bulge Lake
Bulging Lake
Bull Lake (Sioux Narrows-Nestor Falls)
Bull Lake (Sheppard Township, Sudbury District)
Bull Lake (Varley Township, Algoma District)
Bull Lake (Frontenac County)
Bull Lake (Fox Creek, Kenora District)
Bull Lake (Boon Township, Algoma District)
Bull Lake (Thunder Bay District)
Bull Lake (Turner Township, Sudbury District)
Bullbat Lake
Bulldozer Lake
Buller Lake
Bulley Lake
Bullfrog Lake (Cochrane District)
Bullfrog Lake (Algoma District)
Bullfrog Pond
Bullmoose Lake (Rainy River District)
Bullmoose Lake (Thunder Bay District)
Bullock Lake
Bullring Lake
Bullrush Lake
Bulls Eye Lake
Bullseye Lake (Kenora District)
Bullseye Lake (Frontenac County)
Bulpit Lake
Bulrush Lake (Algoma District)
Bulrush Lake (Kenora District)
Bulsch Lake
Bump Lake
Bumpy Lake
Bun Lake
Bunchberry Lake
Bundy Lake
Bungy Lake
Bunion Lake
Bunn Lake
Bunny Lake (Sioux Narrows-Nestor Falls)
Bunny Lake (Algoma District)
Bunny Lake (Rainy River District)
Bunny Lake (Thunder Bay District)
Bunny Lake (Leano Creek, Kenora District)
Bunnyrabbit Lake
Buntain Lake
Bunting Lake
Bunty Lake
Bunyan Lake
Bur Lake
Burbee Lake
Burbidge Lake
Burbot Lake
Burchell Lake
Burd Lake
Burden Lake (Algoma District)
Burden Lake (Kenora District)
Burditt Lake
Burdock Lake
Bures Lake
Burgess Lake (Timiskaming District)
Burgess Lake (Oxford County)
Burk Lake (Thunder Bay District)
Burk Lake (Timiskaming District)
Burke Lake (Nipissing District)
Burke Lake (Rainy River District)
Burke Lake (Manitoulin District)
Burke Lake (Kenora District)
Burke Lake (Hastings County)
Burke Pond
Burl Lakes
Burlap Lake
Burley Lake
Burling Lake
Burn Lake
Burnaby Lake (Thunder Bay District)
Burnaby Lake (Nipissing District)
Burness Lake
Burnet Lake
Burnett Lake (Parry Sound District)
Burnett Lake (Manitoulin District)
Burnett Lake (Algoma District)
Burnetts Pond
Burnfield Lake
Burning Lake
Burnish Lake
Burns Lake (Greater Madawaska)
Burns Lake (Varley Township, Algoma District)
Burns Lake (Muskoka District)
Burns Lake (Sudbury District)
Burns Lake (Madawaska Valley)
Burns Lake (Riggs Township, Algoma District)
Burns Long Lake
Burns Pond
Burnside Lake (Thunder Bay District)
Burnside Lake (Parry Sound District)
Burnt Dam Lake
Burnt Island Lake (Thunder Bay District)
Burnt Island Lake (Nipissing District)
Burnt Lake (Burton Township, Whitestone)
Burnt Lake (Beaton Township, Algoma District)
Burnt Lake (Viel Township, Algoma District)
Burnt Lake (Nipissing District)
Burnt Lake (Patterson Township, Parry Sound District)
Burnt Lake (Kearney)
Burnt Lake (East Burpee Township, Whitestone)
Burnt Lake (Seguin)
Burnt Lake (McConkey Township, Parry Sound District)
Burnt Lake (Secord Township, Sudbury District)
Burnt Lake (Royal Township, Algoma District)
Burnt Lake (Delmage Township, Sudbury District)
Burnt Lake (Kenora District)
Burnt Point Lake
Burnt Ridge Lake
Burntbush Lake
Burntrock Lake
Burntroot Lake
Burntshanty Lake
Burntside Lake
Burntwood Lake (Kenora District)
Burntwood Lake (Sudbury District)
Burr Lake (Kenora District)
Burr Lake (Parry Sound District)
Burr Lake (Algoma District)
Burrell Lake
Burridge Lake
Burritt Lake
Burrow Lake
Burrows Lake (Thunder Bay District)
Burrows Lake (Simcoe County)
Burrows Lake (Algoma District)
Burrows Lake (Sudbury District)
Burslem Lake
Burt Lake (Rainy River District)
Burt Lake (Nipissing District)
Burt Lake (Timiskaming District)
Burton Lake (Sudbury District)
Burton Lake (Rainy River District)
Burton Lake (Kenora District)
Burtt Lake (Algoma District)
Burtt Lake (Thunder Bay District)
Burwash Lake (Muskoka District)
Burwash Lake (Sudbury District)
Burwash Lake (Nipissing District)
Burwash Lake (Malachi Township, Kenora District)
Burwash Lake (Ryerson Creek, Kenora District)
Bury Lake (Kenora District)
Bury Lake (Thunder Bay District)
Burying Lake
Bus Lake
Busby Lake
Busch Lake (Rainy River District)
Busch Lake (Parry Sound District)
Bush Lake (Algoma District)
Bush Lake (Thunder Bay District)
Bush Lake (Cochrane District)
Bush Lake (Nipissing District)
Bush Pond
Bushtail Lake
Bushtrail Lake
Bushwolf Lake
Bushy Lake
Business Lake
Bussineau Lake
Butchart Lake
Butcher Lake
Butcherhook Lake
Butland Lake
Butler Lake (Bradshaw Township, Kenora District)
Butler Lake (Sudbury District)
Butler Lake (Cochrane District)
Butler Lake (Nipissing District)
Butler Lake (Wabigoon Lake, Kenora District)
Butson Lake
Butt Lake
Butter Lake (Kenora District)
Butter Lake (Algoma District)
Butter Tin Lake
Butterfield Lake
Butterfly Lake (Sioux Lookout)
Butterfly Lake (Muskoka District)
Butterfly Lake (Wawapus Creek, Kenora District)
Butterill Lake
Buttermilk Lake (Marmora and Lake)
Buttermilk Lake (Limerick)
Butternut Lake
Butters Lake
Button Lake (Thunder Bay District)
Button Lake (Sudbury District)
Buttonshoe Lake
Buxus Lake
Buzz Lake
Buzzard Lake
Buzzer Lake

Bw–By
Bwan Lake
Bye Lake
Byers Lake (Cochrane District)
Byers Lake (Rainy River District)
Byers Lake (Haliburton County)
Byford Lake
Byline Lake
Byng Lake (Algoma District)
Byng Lake (Timiskaming District)
Byril Lake
Byrne Lake (Parry Sound District)
Byrne Lake (Kenora District)
Byrnes Lake (Hanna Township, Cochrane District)
Byrnes Lake (Algoma District)
Byrnes Lake (Ridge River, Cochrane District)
Byron Lake (Abotossaway Township, Algoma District)
Byron Lake (Nebonaionquet Township, Algoma District)

References
 Geographical Names Data Base, Natural Resources Canada

B